Rob Woodard is a novelist, poet and painter who lives in Long Beach, California. In addition to his "print" books, his work has also appeared on several internet-based literary journals, including Scotland's Laura Hird's website, England's Scarecrow, Ireland's Dogmatika and the UK's The Guardian.

Selected works

 Edgewater: Poems 1992-2009 (Burning Shore Press, 2012)
 Heaping Stones (Burning Shore Press, 2005)

Two other books, What Love Is (a novel) and King Of Long Beach (poems) were rumored to be in the works in 2007/2008 but have not yet been published.

References

External links
Blog page of Rob Woodard
Rob Woodard's articles for The Guardian
Jim Hall interviews Rob Woodard
 Burning Shore Press, Rob Woodard's publisher
Review of Heaping Stones by Rob Woodard on Scarecrow
 Rob Woodard's Poetry on the Laura Hird Website
Scarecrow Magazine Featuring Works by Rob Woodard and other Burning Shore Press Authors

21st-century American novelists
American male novelists
Year of birth missing (living people)
Living people
21st-century American male writers